Giulio Gentile (died 9 January 1572) was a Roman Catholic prelate who served as Bishop of Vulturara e Montecorvino (1552–1572).

Biography
On 27 April 1552, Giulio Gentile was appointed during the papacy of Pope Julius III as Bishop of Vulturara e Montecorvino. He served as Bishop of Vulturara e Montecorvino until his death on 9 January 1572.

While bishop, he was the principal consecrator of Angelo Cesi, Bishop of Todi; and the principal co-consecrator of Giulio Giovio, Coadjutor Bishop of Nocera de' Pagani (1553).

References

External links and additional sources 
 (for Chronology of Bishops) 
 (for Chronology of Bishops) 

16th-century Italian Roman Catholic bishops
1572 deaths
Bishops appointed by Pope Julius III